State Route 196 (SR 196) is a state highway in the U.S. state of Maine. It connects Lewiston to Brunswick, following the Androscoggin River valley.

Route description
ME 196 begins at a junction with US 202, ME 11, and ME 100 in downtown Lewiston and heads southeast. It begins as two one way roads through downtown as Canal Street and Lisbon Street. The two roads then merge together as it exits downtown and ME 196 continues as Lisbon Street. The route runs by the Androscoggin River and interchanges Alfred A. Plourde Parkway, which gives access to I-95 from the highway. The route then passes under I-95 and heads through Lisbon. It becomes concurrent with ME 9 until it reaches the intersection of ME 125, where ME 9 terminates. The route continues along the Androscoggin River heading southeast. It interchanges I-295 heading into Topsham. It intersects US 201, then ME 24 and crossing over the Androscoggin River before reaching its southern terminus at US 1 at a directional T interchange

Major junctions

References

External links

Floodgap Roadgap's RoadsAroundME: Maine State Route 196

196
Transportation in Androscoggin County, Maine
Transportation in Sagadahoc County, Maine
Transportation in Cumberland County, Maine